The Centre de services scolaire des Trois-Lacs is serving 5 francophone school districts in the Canadian province of Quebec. It comprises several primary schools and high schools across municipalities in the Montérégie region. The commission is overseen by a board of elected school trustees. It is headquartered in Vaudreuil-Dorion.

Schools
Secondary:
 École secondaire de la Cité-des-Jeunes (Vaudreuil-Dorion)
 École secondaire du Chêne-Bleu (Pincourt)
 École secondaire Soulanges (Saint-Polycarpe)

Primary:
École à l'Orée-du-Bois (Saint-Lazare)
École Auclair (Saint-Lazare)
École Brind'Amour Pavillon P (Vaudreuil-Dorion)
École Cuillierrier (Saint-Clet) - integrated with École Sainte-Marthe 
École de Coteau-du-Lac (all in Coteau-du-Lac)
 pavillon Académie-Wilson
 pavillon de l'Éclusière 
 pavillon Saint-Ignace
École de la Samare (Notre-Dame-de-l'Île-Perrot)
École de l'Épervière (Rigaud)
École de l'Hymne-au-Printemps (Vaudreuil-Dorion)
École de la Riveraine (Saint-Zotique) - integrated with École Saint-Zotique
École des Orioles (Saint-Zotique)
École du Papillon-Bleu (all in Vaudreuil-Dorion)
pavillon St-Jean-Baptiste
pavillon Sainte-Trinité
École du Val-des-Prés Immaculée-Conception (Saint-Télesphore)
École du Val-des-Prés Sacré-Cœur (Saint-Polycarpe)
École du Val-des-Prés Sainte-Justine (Sainte-Justine-de-Newton)
École François-Perrot (L'Île-Perrot)
École Harwood (Vaudreuil-Dorion)
École José-Maria (Terrasse-Vaudreuil)
École La Perdriolle (L'Île-Perrot)
École Léopold-Carrière (Les Coteaux)
École Marguerite-Bourgeoys (Les Cèdres)
École Notre-Dame-de-la-Garde (Notre-Dame-de-l'Île-Perrot)
École Notre-Dame-de-Lorette (Pincourt)
École Sainte-Madeleine (Vaudreuil-Dorion)
École Sainte-Marthe (Sainte-Marthe) - integrated with École Cuillierrier
École Saint-Michel (Vaudreuil-Dorion)
École Saint-Thomas (Hudson)
École Saint-Zotique - integrated with École de la Riveraine 
École Virginie-Roy (L'Île-Perrot)
École des Étriers (Saint-Lazare)

References

External links
 Centre de services scolaire des Trois-Lacs 

School districts in Quebec
Education in Montérégie